Papilio bridgei is a swallowtail butterfly of the Papilioninae subfamily. It is found on various islands in the Solomons group. It is not threatened.

The larvae feed on Citrus species.

Subspecies
Papilio bridgei bridgei (Bougainville, Choiseul, Santa Isabel, Shortland, Treasury Islands, Fauro Islands)
Papilio bridgei ortegae Rothschild, 1904 (Florida Islands)
Papilio bridgei hecataeus Godman & Salvin, 1888 (Guadalcanal)
Papilio bridgei tryoni Mathew, 1889 (Ugi, San Cristobal)
Papilio bridgei prospero Grose-Smith, 1889 (New Georgia Islands)

Taxonomy
Papilio bridgei is a member of the aegeus species-group . The clade members are

Papilio aegeus Donovan, 1805
Papilio bridgei Mathew, 1886
 ? Papilio erskinei Mathew, 1886
Papilio gambrisius Cramer, [1777]
Papilio inopinatus Butler, 1883
Papilio ptolychus Godman & Salvin, 1888
Papilio tydeus C. & R. Felder, 1860
Papilio weymeri Niepelt, 1914
Papilio woodfordi Godman & Salvin, 1888

Philately
Papilio bridgei depicted on a 5 January 1982 Solomon Islands postage stamp (SLB914: 25c).

Etymology
Named for "Captain Cyprian A. G. Bridge who commanded H.M. ship Espiègle during her long and interesting Commission of nearly four years, a greater portion of which time was spent among the islands of the Western Pacific."

References

External links

Butterfly Corner Images from Naturhistorisches Museum Wien

bridgei
Butterflies described in 1886